Jing-shen Tao (born 1933) is professor emeritus of Chinese history at University of Arizona and Correspondence Research Fellow at Academia Sinica who specializes in medieval Chinese/Inner Asian history, particularly the Song dynasty, Liao dynasty, and Jin dynasty (1115–1234).

His father  was a major scholar-politician during Republic of China (1912–49). Jing-shen Tao was born in mainland China and moved to Taiwan in 1949. Taiwanese author Kuo Cheng is his nephew.

Selected bibliography
 The Jurchen in Twelfth-Century China: A Study of Sinicization (Seattle: University of Washington Press, 1976)
 Two Sons of Heaven: Studies of Sung-Liao Relations (Tucson: University of Arizona Press, 1988).
 Excursions in Chinese Culture: Festschrift in Honor of William R. Schultz, co-authored with Marie Chan and Chia-lin Pao Tao (Hong Kong: The Chinese University Press, 2002).

References

 

University of Arizona faculty
20th-century  Taiwanese historians
1933 births
National Taiwan University alumni
Indiana University alumni
Taiwanese emigrants to the United States
Academic staff of the Chinese University of Hong Kong
Academic staff of Soochow University (Taiwan)
Modern Chinese historians
Living people